Robert S. M. Gray (27 February 1872 – 20 March 1926) was a Scottish professional footballer who played as a winger.

References

1872 births
1926 deaths
Footballers from Stirling
Scottish footballers
Association football wingers
King's Park F.C. players
Aston Villa F.C. players
Grimsby Town F.C. players
Bedminster F.C. players
Middlesbrough F.C. players
Luton Town F.C. players
English Football League players